Robert Henry Bethune (May 5, 1836 – March 27, 1895) was a Canadian banker born in Cobourg, Upper Canada. He was a son of Alexander Neil Bethune and Jane Eliza Crooks (1809-1861).

Robert was raised in Cobourg, educated in private schools and then attended Upper Canada College in Toronto. He began his banking career in Brockville with the Bank of Montreal. He impressed his employers and his responsibilities increased. By 1864 he was the manager in St. Catharines and married. He also changed employers and moved to the Quebec Bank where they were pioneering new approaches to lending. 

In 1870, Bethune took his considerable skills to the newly formed Dominion Bank in Toronto and became the cashier. He began a period of quiet expansion and growth. He was the general manager there for 24 years and oversaw a period of highly successful growth that spanned three economic downturns. 

Bethune could be described as a bold banker and strong administrator who had the loyalty of his staff. While the bank had a conservative approach to investment risk, he worked within those parameters to support existing customers through trying times.

External links 
 Biography at the Dictionary of Canadian Biography Online

1836 births
1895 deaths
Canadian bankers
People from Cobourg
Toronto-Dominion Bank people